Protesilaus earis, the Rothschild's swordtail, is a species of butterfly found in the Neotropical realm (southeast Brazil, Paraguay, Argentina).

Description
Antenna dark yellowish brown. Frons yellowish at the sides. Wings slightly yellowish, beneath slightly reddish; bands narrow, 4. band of the forewing reduced to a small spot, 6. band close to the lower angle of the cell; the yellowish marginal and submarginal spots of the hindwing narrow, above and beneath smaller than in the name-typical protesilaus; hindwing beneath with long arrow-shaped patch before the abdominal margin, this patch reduced in protesilaus. Dorsal margin of the harpe slightly widened, ventral process non-dentate, not extending to the lower edge of the clasper, central process short, broad, spatulate, strongly dentate. Eastern Ecuador, widely distributed.

Status
Uncommon and little known. No known threats.

References

Further reading
D'Abrera, B. (1981). Butterflies of the Neotropical Region. Part I. Papilionidae and Pieridae. Lansdowne Editions, Melbourne, xvi + 172 pp.
D'Almeida, R.F. (1965). Catalogo dos Papilionidae Americanos. Sociedade Brasileira de Entomologia. São Paulo, Brasil.
Rothschild, W. and Jordan, K. (1906). A revision of the American Papilios. Novitates Zoologicae 13: 411-752. online (and as pdf) (Facsimile edition ed. P.H. Arnaud, 1967).

External links
 Butterflies of the Americas Images of holotype.

Papilionidae
Fauna of Brazil
Papilionidae of South America
Butterflies described in 1906